Magdalena Stenbock (14 September 1649 – 24 January 1727), was a politically active Swedish countess and salon holder. She was married to Council President Count Bengt Gabrielsson Oxenstierna. She was recognized as an important contact by foreign diplomats and promoted an anti-French and pro-Austrian policy through her spouse and his office.

Biography
Magdalena Stenbock was born to Count Erik Stenbock, a descendant to Queen Catherine Stenbock, and Catharina von Schwerin. In 1667, she married riksråd count Bengt Gabrielsson Oxenstierna, who was appointed Council President in 1680. Her family belonged to the most powerful in Sweden, and she had a strong position at court through her connections: her stepmother Occa Johanna von Riperda served as Mistress of the Robes in 1671-80, her sister, Hedvig Eleonora Stenbock, served as maid of honor to the queen, and her three nieces also served as maid of honors, among them Beata Sparre, who became influential in her own right.

Stenbock came to play an influential role in politics during the tenure of her spouse in office. During the 1680s and 1690s, Magdalena Stenbock and Bengt Gabrielsson Oxenstierna played a similar role as Christina Piper and Carl Piper in the 1700s, and Margareta Gyllenstierna and Arvid Horn in the 1720s and 1730s: that of a married couple acting as political colleagues.

Through her marriage, she was seen as a potential channel to her spouse (and through him the monarch), a role she was very willing to play, and she was courted by diplomats and supplicants. Foreign diplomats pointed her out as a key figure in Swedish politics because of her influence, and an important person to cultivate. Her salon at the family city residence Hessensteinska palatset was a meeting place for foreign ambassadors in Stockholm, were her gambling table was described as a center of Swedish foreign policy, and it was regarded as a privilege to be invited there and to the family country estate Rosersberg Palace. The ambassadors of Austria (Franz Ottokar Starhemberg), Netherlands (Walraven van Heckeren), Lüneburg (Görtz) and Saxony (Senff von Pilsach) were all frequent guests in her salon.

As a person, Magdalena Stenbock has been described as proud and haughty, as a skillful intriguer and "in wisdom above her husband and her gender". In the reports of foreign diplomats, the views of her spouse, which were important due to his office, were often described in connection to that of his spouse: it was seldom mentioned what the count himself thought as a person, but rather what the count and countess thought collectively. She was known to openly state her views: in April 1698, for example, she openly declared that her spouse had found a way to oppose an alliance between Sweden and France and that he was about to write a memorial proving why such an alliance would be a mistake.

During the late 17th-century, the alliance policy was an important factor, in which she was an active participator. She was anti French and Pro Habsburg and supported an alliance between Sweden and Austria against France. She also supported a marriage alliance between Sweden and Austria and tried to prevent a marriage alliance between Austria and Poland. According to the Danish ambassador Jens Juel that she and her spouse were both bought by bribes from the Holy Roman Emperor.

Around 1700, Bengt Gabrielsson Oxenstierna lost his leading position in Swedish politics to Carl Piper, and Magdalena Stenbock to Christina Piper, which was reportedly taken as an insult by them, as the Pipers were only newly ennobled and considered upstarts. Nevertheless, Magdalena Stenbock acted and courted Christina Piper with gifts to promote the careers of her relatives. After becoming a widow in 1702, it was reportedly thanks to Carl Piper that Stenbock were able to keep the pension of her late spouse.

During the fire of the royal palace Tre kronor in 1697, the royal family took refuge in her home.

See also 
 Hedvig Catharina Lillie

References 

 Wilhelmina Stålberg, Anteckningar om svenska qvinnor (1864) (Swedish)

1649 births
Swedish salon-holders
1727 deaths
Swedish countesses
People of the Swedish Empire
17th-century Swedish women
17th-century Swedish nobility